Shaoxing Metro, also known as Shaoxing Rail Transit, is the metro system in Shaoxing, Zhejiang province, China.

Network

Line 1 

Line 1 began construction in 2016. The section from Guniangqiao to China Textile City opened on 28 June 2021, the remaining section from China Textile City to Fangquan opened on 29 April 2022. A branch line from Huangjiu Town to Convention & Exhibition Center will open in 2024.

The western terminus, is also the eastern terminus of Hangzhou Metro Line 5.

In the future, Line 1 of Shaoxing Metro and Line 5 of Hangzhou Metro will merge to Hangzhou's Line 5 metro line.

Future Development

Planned
The Phase II Construction Plan of Shaoxing Metro, including Line 2 (Phase 2) and Lines 3, 4, 5, is under planning. Line 4 is a southern extension of the Line 1 branch which is currently under construction.

Lines S2 (Shaoxing–Zhuji) and S3 (Shaoxing–Shengzhou–Xinchang) are under planning.

References 

 
Rapid transit in China
Rail transport in Zhejiang
Railway lines opened in 2021
2021 establishments in China